Greenlands is a rural locality in the Southern Downs Region, Queensland, Australia. In the  Greenlands had a population of 250 people.

Geography 
Stanthorpe – Texas Road passes from east to west through the locality.

History 

The locality is named after Bertram (Jack) Greenland, a building contractor in Stanthorpe.

Thorndale State School opened in 1915. It was relocated to a new location near Spring Creek in 1924 and opened on 12 November 1924 as Greenlands State School. (Note another Thorndale State School opened in neighbouring Thorndale in 1945).

In the  Greenlands had a population of 250 people.

Education 
Greenlands State School is a government co-educational primary (P-6) school at 1209 Texas Road. In 2016, the school had enrolment of 106 students with 8 teachers  (6 full-time equivalent) with 9 non-teaching staff (4 full-time equivalent).

References

Further reading 
 

Southern Downs Region
Localities in Queensland